Sa Re Ga Ma Pa 2021 was the 30th season of the longest running singing reality show of India Sa Re Ga Ma Pa that aired on 16 October 2021 to 6 March 2022.

Auditions
The channel started taking auditions for the 30th season from 15 July 2021 through "Missed Call Based Link Providing Method" and invites young aspiring singers to take part on the show. The auditions gets closed on 15 August 2021.

Judges
The channel approaches Himesh Reshammiya, Vishal Dadlani and Shankar Mahadevan as the judging panel for its 30th season.

Judges and host

The channel first announces Aditya Narayan as the host of the upcoming season and Aditya Narayan also confirmed that news but later on some media reports claiming that Narayan is quitting his hosting career and he wants to work for Grammy Awards, however there's no official confirmation about quitting this season comes yet from Zee TV. On 18 September, the channel releases its official trailer on YouTube and confirmed officially that Narayan will host the show.

Talking about the show, Narayan says, "Sa Re Ga Ma Pa is like a homecoming for me. It's a show that I have been associated with for a really long time and the stage is just like home to me. I have hosted nearly seven seasons of this show, right from 2007 to 2018. When I was just about 18 years old, my first ever job in the television Industry was with Sa Re Ga Ma Pa."

Top 16 Contestants

Grand jury

References

External links

 on IMDb

Hindi-language television shows
Sa Re Ga Ma Pa
2020 Indian television seasons
Zee TV original programming